Events in the year 1970 in Bulgaria.

Incumbents 

 General Secretaries of the Bulgarian Communist Party: Todor Zhivkov
 Chairmen of the Council of Ministers: Todor Zhivkov

Events 

 26 February – Rusenski Lom Nature Park, a protected area in northern Bulgaria in the Ivanovo Municipality of the Ruse Province, was established.

Sports 

 September 29 – October 12 – The 1970 FIVB Volleyball Men's World Championship, the seventh edition of the tournament, was held in Sofia, Bulgaria.

References 

 
1970s in Bulgaria
Years of the 20th century in Bulgaria
Bulgaria
Bulgaria